This list of bridges in the Republic of Ireland lists bridges of particular historical, scenic, architectural or engineering interest. Road and railway bridges, viaducts, aqueducts and footbridges are included.

Historical and architectural interest bridges

Major road and railway bridges 
This table presents the structures with spans greater than 100 meters (non-exhaustive list).

List of bridges in Dublin

List of bridges in the rest of Ireland

Notes and references 
 

 

 Others references

See also 

 List of Dublin bridges and tunnels
 Transport in the Republic of Ireland
 Roads in Ireland
 Rail transport in the Republic of Ireland
 Geography of the Republic of Ireland

External links

Further reading 
 
 
 

Ireland
 
Bridges
Bridges